Mathieu "Mat" Herben (born 15 July 1952) is a Dutch journalist, civil servant and retired politician of the dissolved Pim Fortuyn List (LPF) party and served as leader of the LPF 2003 to 2006.

In May 2002, the party of the slain populist Pim Fortuyn elected him as its new leader, after the party turned out in force in the parliamentary elections. As of 23 May 2002 he has been a member of LPF's parliamentary party in the House of Representatives of the Staten-Generaal. In 2004 Herben served as the fraction leader as well as the chairman of the party. In the elections held on 22 January 2003 he was the so-called lijsttrekker.

Mat Herben was born in The Hague. From 1977 to 1987 he worked as a journalist and at the Dutch Ministry of Defence. From 1987 to 1990 he was the editor of the Catholic family magazine Manna, and in the 1990s he was also the editor of Sta-Vast, the magazine published by the right-wing organization Oud-Strijders Legioen. In 1993 he founded the local political party Leefbaar Linschoten. From 1990 to 1995 he wrote reviews on classical music and publications about popular medical and social topics. From 1990 tot 2002 he was public relations official, chief editor of diverse magazines and worked again at the Dutch Ministry of Defence. 

Between March and May 2002 he was spokesman of the Lijst Pim Fortuyn and from May 2002 until October 2004 chairman of this party. In November 2006, he retired as a member of the House of Representatives of the Netherlands. In parliament, Herben campaigned against female genital mutilation, and in accordance to Fortuyn's policy, called for the practice to be banned. In November 2003 Prime Minister Balkenende and Minister of Justice Piet Hein Donner called for a limit on the number of satires about the Dutch royal family. During the debate on the matter, Herben put on a red clown nose before speaking at the interruption microphone in parliament to ask whether this would violate the proposed rules. Balkenende then complimented him on his nose.

One of his last activities in parliament involved campaigning to limit the influence of the European Union on Dutch regulations. In November 2006 Herben submitted a private member's bill to end all EU influence together on Dutch domestic regulation with Reformed Political Party politician Kees van der Staaij, but when the LPF lost all representation in parliament during the 2006 Dutch general election, Van der Staaij took on this defense. In June 2009 the vote in the House of Representatives was postponed, but in September 2015 the House of Representatives approved this. The treatment in the Senate was then halted for two years. On 9 April 2019, the Senate rejected this proposal, after thirteen years.

Between 2005 and 2009, Herben was an author for STA-VAST, the magazine of the Dutch right wing conservative organization Oud-Strijders Legioen.
        
Herben now lives in Linschoten. He is interested in defence, international security and aviation.

In 2018, Herben made a small return to politics in which he was elected as a councilor for the Lokaal Montfoort party.

Herben has been married since 1975 and has one daughter. He is a Catholic and also a Freemason.

Publications
 "De Luchtstrijdkrachten van het Warschaupact en neutraal Europa" (1982)
 "Vijftig jaar vrijmetselarij"
 "Vrij Denken – over religie, politiek en vrijmetselarij" (2005)

References
  Parlement.com biography

1952 births
Living people
Dutch civil servants
Dutch journalists
Dutch Roman Catholics
Leaders of political parties in the Netherlands
Members of the House of Representatives (Netherlands)
Politicians from The Hague
Pim Fortuyn List politicians
21st-century Dutch politicians